Defending champion Steffi Graf defeated Martina Navratilova in the final, 6–2, 6–7(1–7), 6–1 to win the ladies' singles tennis title at the 1989 Wimbledon Championships. It was her second Wimbledon title and seventh major title overall. This also marked the third consecutive year where Graf and Navratilova contested the final.

In her final Wimbledon appearance, Chris Evert reached her 52nd career major semifinal, an Open Era record. She failed to reach the semifinals of a major only four times during her career, the only one at Wimbledon being in 1983.

Seeds

  Steffi Graf (champion)
  Martina Navratilova (final)
  Gabriela Sabatini (second round)
  Chris Evert (semifinals)
  Zina Garrison (second round)
  Helena Suková (fourth round)
  Arantxa Sánchez Vicario (quarterfinals)
  Pam Shriver (third round)
  Natasha Zvereva (third round)
  Jana Novotná (fourth round)
  Monica Seles (fourth round)
  Mary Joe Fernández (fourth round)
  Helen Kelesi (first round)
  Hana Mandlíková (fourth round)
  Lori McNeil (fourth round)
  Susan Sloane (second round)

Qualifying

Draw

Finals

Top half

Section 1

Section 2

Section 3

Section 4

Bottom half

Section 5

Section 6

Section 7

Section 8

References

External links

1989 Wimbledon Championships – Women's draws and results at the International Tennis Federation

Women's Singles
Wimbledon Championship by year – Women's singles
Wimbledon Championships
Wimbledon Championships